Masarh or Masar is a village situated 10 km west of Arrah in Bhojpur district of Bihar. It is an important historical site for Jains and Hindus.

Etymology 
Masarh is derived from the word Mahāsāra. A 600 old Jain inscription in the temple of Parshvanatha has mentioned this place as Mahāsāra. However, according to some other people, its name was Padmvatipura which was later chanced by a Jain Marwar to Vimalnath, after that it was changed to Matisara and then it became Masarh.

History

According to localities, It was the residence of Banasura, whose daughter Ukha married to Aniruddha the grandson of Krishna and its name was Sonitpur. According to Archaeological Survey of India there was a statue of Banasur on ruined mould, but later the mound was excavated for making bricks for railways and the statues was in the pool made after excavation. Since Banasura was a demon and enemy of gods the villagers didn't try to save the statue, children often used to pelt stones on the statues. After that, the statues got immersed in water after first rain.

The earliest mention of the village can be found in the accounts of Xuanzang, where he named it as mo-ho-so-lo. He described these places as the Places of Brahmins who didn't have respect for the laws of Buddha.

Archeological findings 
Foundations of many old small temples and large number of Brahmanical statues have been found at this place.

See also
 Masarh lion
 Parashanatha Temple, Arrah

References 

Villages in Bhojpur district, India